Tegula quadricostata is a species of sea snail, a marine gastropod mollusk in the family Tegulidae.

Description
The size of the shell varies between 15 mm and 30 mm. The thick, solid, umbilicate shell has a conical shape and has a blackish color. The spire is conoidal. The apex is rather blunt. The sutures are canaliculate. The six whorls are encircled by four coarsely tuberculose ribs on the upper surface ; the upper  two contiguous, sometimes coalescent. The base of the shell shows 3 or 4 separated smaller beaded ribs, the broad interstices both above and below densely, finely spirally striate. The periphery is obtusely angular. The base is nearly flat. The oblique aperture is smooth within. The oblique columella is sinuous and bidentate. The umbilicus is surrounded by a white callus, bearing inside a strong spiral rib which terminates in a denticle about the middle of the columella.

Distribution
This species occurs in the Pacific Ocean between Peru and Chile.

References

External links
 World Register of Marine Species
 

quadricostata
Gastropods described in 1828